Kurilovo is a rural locality (a village) and the administrative center of Kurilovskoye Rural Settlement, Sobinsky District, Vladimir Oblast, Russia. The population was 718 as of 2010. There are 9 streets.

Geography 
Kurilovo is located 14 km north of Sobinka (the district's administrative centre) by road. Karacharovo is the nearest rural locality.

References 

Rural localities in Sobinsky District